Kiran Ahluwalia is a Canadian singer-songwriter who infuses African desert blues and Western musical styles. Ahluwalia won the 'Newcomer' category in the inaugural Songlines Music Awards (2009) – announced 1 May 2009 – the new 'world music' awards organised by the UK-based magazine, Songlines.

Personal life 

Ahluwalia was born in Patna, grew up in Delhi and moved to Toronto at the age of nine. After completing her MBA at Dalhousie University, she returned to Toronto with the plan of being in the financial services industry, she changed her mind and went back to India to study music and then returned to Toronto to build her career as a musician.

Ahluwalia is married to guitar player and co-arranger Rez Abbasi, and currently lives in New York.

In 2016, Ahluwalia was one of the recipients of the Top 25 Canadian Immigrant Awards presented by Canadian Immigrant Magazine.

Discography 

With Rez Abbasi
Things to Come (Sunnyside, 2009)

Featured by Delerium
Indoctrination (from Nuages du Monde) (Nettwerk, 2006)

References

External links 
 Kiran Ahluwalia
 Kiran Ahluwalia performing on NYC Radio LIVE!
 Kiran Ahluwalia Interview at allaboutjazz.com
Kiran Ahluwalia on Facebook

Living people
1965 births
Musicians from Patna
Indian emigrants to Canada
Musicians from Toronto
Canadian women singer-songwriters
Canadian world music musicians
Canadian musicians of Indian descent
Canadian people of Punjabi descent
Dalhousie University alumni
Juno Award for Global Music Album of the Year winners
Canadian Folk Music Award winners
Expatriate musicians in India
Canadian expatriates in India
21st-century Canadian singers
21st-century Canadian women singers
Ahluwalia